The blue scrotum sign of Bryant is an ecchymosis of the scrotum. It is a medical sign associated with ruptured abdominal aortic aneurysm (AAA) that is leaking relatively slowly. Rupture of the aneurysm causes blood to accumulate in the retroperitoneal space and extravasate into the scrotal tissue via the inguinal canal. It was first described by John Henry Bryant in a series of autopsies conducted on people who died of AAA. It is typically seen 3–5 days after leakage of the aneurysm.

References 

Medical signs